Christopher Kirwan (died 24 November 2013) was an Irish Labour Party politician and trade unionist. He served as a member of Seanad Éireann from 1983 to 1987. He was nominated by the Taoiseach Garret FitzGerald to the 17th Seanad in 1983. He did not contest the 1987 Seanad election.

He was a lifelong trade unionist and in 1981 was the General Secretary of the Irish Transport and General Workers' Union (ITGWU).

References

Year of birth missing
2013 deaths
Trade unionists from Dublin (city)
Labour Party (Ireland) senators
Members of the 17th Seanad
Politicians from Dublin (city)
Presidents of the Irish Congress of Trade Unions
Nominated members of Seanad Éireann
Alumni of the National College of Ireland